Ivan Runje (born 9 October 1990) is a Croatian professional footballer who plays as a centre-back.

Career
Runje started his career with Mosor Žrnovnica.

He played one game for the Croatia national under-21 football team, in 2013.

References

External links
 

1990 births
Living people
Footballers from Split, Croatia
Association football central defenders
Croatian footballers
Croatia under-21 international footballers
NK Mosor players
FC Nordsjælland players
AC Omonia players
Jagiellonia Białystok players
First Football League (Croatia) players
Danish Superliga players
Cypriot First Division players
Ekstraklasa players
III liga players
Croatian expatriate footballers
Expatriate men's footballers in Denmark
Croatian expatriate sportspeople in Denmark
Expatriate footballers in Cyprus
Croatian expatriate sportspeople in Cyprus
Expatriate footballers in Poland
Croatian expatriate sportspeople in Poland